Gordus or Gordos was a town located on the Rhodius River in the ancient Troad mentioned by Strabo. 

Its site is unlocated, but probably located between the Karamenderes River (the ancient Scamander) and the Çan Çayı (the ancient Granicus).

References

Populated places in ancient Troad
Former populated places in Turkey
Lost ancient cities and towns